The Houtman Abrolhos is an island chain off the west coast of Australia. It is widely reported that the Houtman Abrolhos contains 122 islands, but only 93 islands had gazetted names in 1996. In the gazetteer of 2011 Hartley Island appears no more, but Barge Rock, Second Sister and Shag Rock appear, which raises the number of gazetted names to 96 (30 in the Wallabi Group, 38 in the Pelsaert Group and 28 in the Easter Group).

In addition to the gazetted islands, six island groups have been gazetted. The three main groups are the Wallabi Group, the Easter Group and the Pelsaert Group. In addition, the Easter Group contains a group known as the Eastern Islands, and the Pelsaert group contains groups known as the Mangrove Group and the Numbered Islands.

The Inventory of the Land Conservation Values of the Houtman Abrolhos mentions many more unofficially named islets, 16 in the Wallabi Group, 26 in the Eastern Group and 15 in the Pelsaert Group, plus the subgroups of the Jackson Islets (7 islets without individual names or numbers) and The Coral Patches (13 islets without individual names or numbers), also in the Pelsaert Group.

This makes for a total of 173 known islands, islets and above-water rocks with land area in the Houtman Abrolhos.

This list is complete with respect to the 1996 Gazetteer of Australia.

See also
List of rocks in Western Australia

References

Houtman Abrolhos
Lists of coordinates
Houtman Abrolhos